King Flower is a 2013 Taiwanese comedy romance television series. It was produced by SETTV and started filming on November 26, 2012. It stars James Wen and Nikki Xie (謝欣穎). It was first aired on January 6, 2013 on TTV.

Synopsis
The ugly Jin Da Hua has buck-teeth and a large mole on her face which causes her to be teased and ridiculed all her life. She daydreams that if she could only be as beautiful as Du Liang Yan- Ouyang Tai's fiancé, Da Hua's best friend, Lin Guan Jun, might fall in love with her. Due to a hiking accident, Liang Yan falls off a cliff while on a trip with her fiancé. Just because Da Hua has a slight resemblance, she is given a chance to change her life as she undergoes plastic surgery and takes up Du Liang Yan's name and identity.

Cast

Main cast
Chris Wu as Ouyang Tai 
Ouyang Tai, The GM of Shen Da Realty, He was engaged to Du Liang Yan who was severely injured during an accident, He found Jin Da Hua to replace his fiancé temporarily, As time goes he found out his fiancé died..And at that hard time Jin Da Hua was willing to comfort him and stay by his side which made him fall in love with Da Hua.

Nikki Xie as Jin Da Hua / Du Liang Yan 
Jin Da Hua, a 28-year-old female is the daughter of a provision shop owner. She is enthusiastic and cheerful girl since she was young but because of malocclusion and a mole on an awkward part of her forehead, she was always bullied by the other kids. Da Hua hopes that one day she would be able to give her first kiss and also her 'first time' to her childhood crush, Lin Guan Jun. After coincidentally meeting Du Liang Yan and her fiancé, Ouyang Tai, in her family opened convenient store, she was thinking if she one day becomes as beautiful as Du Liang Yan. Would Guan Jun accept her love for him? After owing a debt of 2 million from illegal money lenders, Jin Da Hua had no choice but to undergo plastic surgery and take up Du Liang Yan's name to impersonate Ouyang Tai's fiancé.

Du Liang Yan, a 28-year-old lady is the manager of the design department in Shen Da Corporation. Liang Yan is beautiful, intelligent, kind, quiet and is also good at playing the piano. She is engaged to Ouyang Tai and is very much in love with each other. Since she was young, Liang Yan was the apple to her father's eye and always tries to live up to her father's expectations. Liang Yan tries not to do anything dangerous or risky because she doesn't want her father to worry about her. But she has always wanted to try something thrilling so Liang Yan begged Ouyang to go hiking knowing that he loved to hike. However, Liang Yan fell when she was halfway up the mountain during the hike. She was rushed to the hospital immediately.
 
James Wen as Lin Guan Jun 
After losing his parents when he was just a child, Lin Guan Jun was adopted and raised by Jin Da Hua's mother. Having growing up together with Da Hua, Guan Jun always bickered with Da Hua but he protects and looks after Da Hua like his own younger sister. Although knowing that Da Hua has feelings for him, he tries to avoid the topic because of Da Hua's looks, but he is also unable to hide his love for her. Working as a delivery man, Guan Jun likes to gamble during his free time and after creating trouble, he always runs back to the Jin's family convenient store to hide. But if he's faced with serious trouble, he would not hesitate to protect his loved ones from getting hurt.

Extended cast

Lene Lai as Yu Kai Le  - Supervisor of the secretary in Shen Da Corporation and dreams of one day becoming Ouyang's wife.
Zhao Jun Ya (趙駿亞) as Qin Mo

Market Place
Kuo Shu-yao as Ah Xi - Employee of a florist and is Da Hua's best friend 
Hsueh Shih-ling as Jin Da Li - Da Hua's younger brother
Tai Bao (太保) as Jin Zheng Yin 
Yang Li-yin as Xia Chun Jiao/Mama Jin
Yuan Ai Fei (袁艾菲) as Hu Xiao Fei 
Luo Bei An as Hu Jin Biao 
Frankie Huang as Xiao Dao

Sheng Da Corporation
Jian Chang as Ouyang Feng 
Lin Xiu Jun (林秀君) as He Xiu Xiu 
Wang Juan as Yan Li Ting
Chen Zhi Qiang (陳志強) as Ouyang Sen
Yin Fu (茵芙) as Xu Wei Ni 
Guan Yong (關勇) as Du Sheng Heng 
Li Yi Jin (李依瑾) as Zhao Pei Qi 
Zhuang Zhuang (壯壯) as Ma Cheng Hong 
Yang Han (楊瀚) as Yang Zu Rong 
Wu Jia Wei (吳迦瑋) as Qi Qi

Soundtrack
The series did not release an original soundtrack. However, songs are used in the series. In particular, the series had five songs from different artists, released in their respective albums. The opening theme song used is "Yin Wei You Ni Zai" or "Because You're There" by Dream Girls, while the ending theme song used is by S.H.E entitled "像女孩的女人" or "A Girl Like A Woman".

Track listing

Broadcast

Episode ratings
Since its first broadcast, King Flower topped the ranks with the total average of 1.57. Its drama competitors were CTV's Borrow Your Love, CTS's K Song Lover, and FTV's The Queen of SOP. The viewers survey was conducted by AGB Nielsen.

Notes

References

External links
SETTV Official site 
TTV Official site

Taiwanese drama television series
Sanlih E-Television original programming
Taiwan Television original programming
2013 Taiwanese television series debuts
2013 Taiwanese television series endings
Taiwanese romantic comedy television series